As of January 4th, 2022, Durhamtown Plantation (Durhamtown Off Road Resort) has been closed. The resort reopened in March of 2022 and is now know as Georgia Off-Road Adventures. 

Up until 2002 owner, Mike McCommons leased out his  of land to hunters and harvested the timber. In 2002 McCommons decided to turn it into a Sportsman resort. On his property McCommons created many trails for dirt bikes, ATVs, side by sides and 4-wheel drive vehicles. He also set aside some of his land for a Sportsman area where people can shoot guns, go hunting and fishing.

Mx, ATV's and side by sides
Durhamtown has 14 motocross tracks, a 2.21 mile national motocross track,  and  drag strip, oval track, single track and a freestyle motocross park. Every year Durhamtown hosts Motocross races from pee-wee/beginner racers up to the more advanced expert racers.

4×4 Park
The 4×4 park has many trails ranging in difficulty for stock vehicles to modified vehicles. On these trails there are hill climbs, rock crawling, and plenty of mud sections.

Lodging
After a day of riding Durhamtown has cabins and RVs for rental. They also have premade camp sites. For those who decide to use the camp site there is a bathhouse to wash up at the end of the day.

Proshop
The Proshop sells all types of equipment for riding at Durhamtown. They have riding gear, boots, helmets, parts and accessories. The Durhamtown also has a service department for onsite tune-ups and repairs. The Proshop does rent out dirt bikes, ATVs and side by sides to those who want to come out and do not own such recreational vehicles. McCommons does have storage space for ATVs, dirk bikes, side by sides, and RVs for people who decide to leave them there till their next ride.

Hunting and fishing
For those who like hunting, Durhamtown McCommons provides opportunities to hunt whitetail deer, hogs, wild turkey and small game. Durhamtown has a sporting clay shooting area and a shooting range. Durhamtown also has a  pond which is stocked with catfish and bream for fishing.

Safety
Durhamtown Plantation has a medical staff present on the property in case of emergencies. Durhamtown has a contract with Trauma Care Emergency Services Inc that employs paramedics with Polaris Rangers that are "mini ambulances" equipped with the same required gear as ambulances, but in fewer quantities.

References

Farms in Georgia (U.S. state)
Geography of Taliaferro County, Georgia
Tourist attractions in Taliaferro County, Georgia
1793 establishments in Georgia (U.S. state)